Mogalrajapuram is a major residential and commercial area in Vijayawada. It is one of the shopping district of the city. It is located at centre of Vijayawada beside low range hills.The area consists of many shopping malls.The area is well connected to the other places of city Suryaraopet, Governorpet, Beasent Road, Gunadala, Benz circle Ramavarappadu

See also 
 Mogalrajapuram Caves

References 

Neighbourhoods in Vijayawada